The Truth is an anthology fiction podcast and founding member of Radiotopia by PRX. Episodes are released about once every two weeks. Several nationally syndicated public radio programs, including This American Life, Studio 360, Snap Judgment, and The Story, have featured work by The Truth.

History 
In 2009, Jonathan Mitchell and Hillary Frank received funding from American Public Media to produce pilot stories together. One of those stories was "Moon Graffiti", which was later featured on The Guardian podcast and won the 2010 Gold Mark Time Award. This story later became the first episode of The Truth.

In December 2011, Ed Herbstman and Mitchell hired a group of improvisors (many from the Magnet Theater, which Herbtsman co-founded) to write stories together, with the goal of producing a story in one month. The first piece was "Interruptible". The group continued working together and eventually reached the podcast's current output of two stories a month.

The Truth was named by iTunes to be the Best New Arts podcast of 2012 and the #1 new podcast of 2012 by The Daily Dot.

The show's title comes from a quote by Ralph Waldo Emerson: "Fiction reveals truth that reality obscures."

Episodes

2012

2013

2014

2015

2016

2017

2018

Awards

References

External links 
 This American Life #463 - Own Worst Enemy
 Transom - "Modern Radio Drama" article
 Third Coast Audio Festival interview
 Inside Stories podcast
 Daily Dot: "The Truth" according to Jonathan Mitchell
 Comedy Conglomerate interview with Jonathan Mitchell
 WNPR program Where We Live
 Guardian UK feature on The Truth
 Radio Drama Revival interview with Jonathan Mitchell
 Studio 360
 Snap Judgment
 The Story
 On Radio: The Truth, and Other Jeopardies
 Beginnings Podcast Interview of Jonathan Mitchell
 The Truth Podcast Meets Fundraising Goal

American public radio programs
Radiotopia
Audio podcasts
2012 podcast debuts
American podcasts